Club de Rugby La Vila is a Spanish rugby team based in La Vila Joiosa, Spain.

History
Club de Rugby La Vila was established in 1982 by rugby fans from La Vila Joiosa city.

The club played in regional divisions until 2008 when it achieved the promotion to División de Honor.

Trophies
Spanish leagues: 1 
2010–11
Supercopa de España: 1
2011

Season by season

5 seasons in División de Honor
3 seasons in División de Honor B

Squad 2012–13

International honours
  Matthew Cook
  Rodrigo Martínez Sánchez
  Marcos Poggi
  Hernán Quirelli

External links
Official website

Spanish rugby union teams
Rugby clubs established in 1982
Sports teams in the Valencian Community
1982 establishments in Spain
Villajoyosa